Micro Focus International plc is a British multinational software and information technology business based in Newbury, Berkshire, England. The firm provides software and consultancy. The company was listed on the London Stock Exchange until it was acquired by the Canadian software firm OpenText in January 2023.

History

Micro Focus was founded in 1976. In 1981, it became the first company to win the Queen's Award for Industry purely for developing a software product. The product was CIS COBOL, a standard-compliant COBOL implementation for microcomputers.

The same year the company acquired XDB Systems with their XDB Enterprise Server relational database management system. In 2001 the business was demerged from Merant with help from Golden Gate Capital Partners and once again became Micro Focus. It was listed on the London Stock Exchange in 2005.

In May 2007, San Diego-based Acucorp, Inc., a developer of COBOL development tools and provider of technologies for COBOL applications, was acquired by Micro Focus for its ACUCOBOL-GT product lines.

In July 2008, the company acquired the privately held Austin, Texas-based Liant Software Corporation for its RM/COBOL and PL/I product lines. Liant Software owned the assets of Ryan-McFarland Corporation, a Micro Focus competitor in the 1980s.

In July 2009, the company acquired Borland, a developer of application lifecycle management tools, as well as the Quality Solutions part of Compuware, including the automation tool TestPartner.

In 2011, the company alleged that the New South Wales Police Force and other agencies were using 16,500 copies of its ViewNow software on various computers when police and other agencies were only ever entitled to 6,500 licences. The group initially alleged  in damages but later increased this to  after reviewing the results of a court-ordered audit of the police force's computer systems. The police force maintained during the court proceedings that it had paid for a site licence that entitled it to unlimited installations of the software for all of its officers. Despite this, it settled the matter out of court in 2012, for an undisclosed sum. The other agencies previously settled the matter out of court, also for undisclosed sums.

In December 2013, Micro Focus acquired the Orbix, Orbacus and Artix software product lines from Progress Software. These market-leading implementations of the CORBA standard were originally developed by IONA Technologies.

Attachmate's parent company Wizard Parent LLC—consisting of the investment groups Elliott Management Corporation, Francisco Partners, Golden Gate Capital, and Thoma Bravo, would hold a 40% stake in Micro Focus post-acquisition. With the purchase of Attachmate, Micro Focus became the owner of the Unix operating system.

In 2015, Micro Focus acquired Authasas, which produces authentication middleware.

The acquisition was completed on 2 May 2016.

On 7 September 2016, Micro Focus announced its intent to merge with Hewlett Packard Enterprise’s software business segment. The merger was completed on 1 September 2017.

On 4 October 2016, Micro Focus announced it had acquired Gwava Inc., an enterprise information archiving business.

On 19 March 2018, Micro Focus shares fell 55% to 849p after the company warned of a sharp fall in revenue; its chief executive, Chris Hsu, resigned.

On 2 July 2018, it was announced that Micro Focus would sell its SUSE business segment to EQT Partners for $2.535 billion.

In July 2020, Micro Focus acquired Turkish cybersecurity company ATAR Labs for an undisclosed amount.

In August 2022, Canadian software firm OpenText announced that it would acquire Micro Focus in a deal valued at US$6billion. The acquisition was approved by the court on 27 January 2023, so allowing the transaction to be completed on 31 January 2023.

Acucorp, Inc.
Acucorp was founded in 1988 by sister and brother, Pamela Coker, CEO, and Drake Coker, Chief Scientist. Drake wrote a file system, Vision, and a COBOL compiler, ACUCOBOL-85, now called ACUCOBOL-GT. ACUCOBOL-GT offers a comprehensive set of extensions for programming and managing Graphical User Interfaces (GUIs). With these extensions, an ACUCOBOL-GT developer can add a full-featured GUI entirely in COBOL to an existing program.

Liant Software Corporation

Liant Software Corporation was founded in 1983. This company was an outgrowth of the 3-way partnership named Digitek and a successor named Ryan-McFarland Corporation, which was sold to an Australian company named Austec. They sold it to a company named Language Processors, Inc - later renamed Liant Software Corporation. The latter was acquired by Micro Focus International. Liant was still advertising its Open PL/I product in 1995.

Ryan-McFarland Corporation
Dave McFarland and Don Ryan, both with a Digitek background, co-founded Ryan-McFarland Corporation. Ryan-McFarland was a major source for FORTRAN, COBOL and BASIC in the PC arena.

References

External links

1976 establishments in England
2005 initial public offerings
British brands
British companies established in 1976
British subsidiaries of foreign companies
Companies based in Newbury, Berkshire
Companies formerly listed on the London Stock Exchange
Companies formerly listed on the New York Stock Exchange
Information technology consulting firms of the United Kingdom
International information technology consulting firms
 
Multinational companies headquartered in England
Software companies established in 1976
Software companies of England
2023 mergers and acquisitions